Scarburgh is a surname. Notable people with the surname include:

George Parker Scarburgh (1807–1879), American judge
Charles Scarburgh (1615–1694), English physician and mathematician
John Scarburgh (fl. 1406), English Member of Parliament

See also
Scarborough (disambiguation)